Jemison is an English surname. Notable people with the surname include:

 Alice Lee Jemison (1901–1964), American political activist
 Dick Jemison (1886–1965), American sportswriter 
 Eddie Jemison (born 1963), American actor
 Edwin Francis Jemison (1844–1862), American Civil War soldier
 Julio Jemison (born 1994), Bahamian footballer
 Mae Jemison (born 1956), American astronaut, engineer and physician 
 Marty Jemison (born 1965), American cyclist 
 Mary Jemison (1743–1833), Scots-Irish American frontierswoman
 Mike Jemison (born 1983), American football player
 Robert Jemison Jr. (1802–1871), American politician and entrepreneur
 Steffani Jemison (born 1981), American artist
 T. J. Jemison (1918–2013), American clergyman

See also
 Jemison, Alabama, town in Chilton County, Alabama, in the United States
 Jamison (disambiguation)
 N. K. Jemisin (born 1972), American author

 

English-language surnames